Grace Kim (born 13 December 2000) is an Australian professional golfer who plays on the Epson Tour. She won the TPS Sydney on the ALPG Tour in 2021 and 2022. As an amateur, she won the Australian Girls' Amateur, Australian Women's Amateur and the 2018 Summer Youth Olympics.

Career 
Kim, raised in Greenacre, New South Wales by Korean-born parents, enjoyed a stellar amateur career and in 2019 reached No. 29 in the World Amateur Golf Ranking to become Australia's highest-ranked female amateur. She amassing a number of titles, including the 2017 Australian Girls' Amateur and the 2018 Annika Invitational Australasia in New Zealand with rounds of 72, 62 and 68 (−16). After back-to-back wins in the NSW Women's Amateur in 2020 and 2021, she triumphed at the 2021 Australian Women's Amateur in Adelaide.

She is a four-time recipient of the Karrie Webb Scholarship, and won an individual gold medal at the 2018 Youth Olympics in Buenos Aires. She became Australia's second-ever competitor in the Augusta National Women's Amateur.

Kim also played for the Australia National Team, and she won bronze at the 2017 Toyota Junior Golf World Cup in Japan. In 2018, she represented Australia at the Espirito Santo Trophy and Queen Sirikit Cup. She won the Patsy Hankins Trophy with the Asia/Pacific team in 2018.

In 2019, she participated in the Korean National Sports Festival, where she shot a 61, including a 28 on the first 9 holes, to comfortably win the international women's gold.

Kim is a member of Avondale Golf Club and was co-captain of the NSW Women's team which defended their crown at the 2019 Australian Interstate Teams Matches. She was awarded Golf NSW's Female Golfer of the Year in 2019.

Kim spent 7.5 months in the United States during 2021 and won two titles on the Women's All-Pro Tour as an amateur. She finished tied 10th at the Prasco Charity Championship and competed in the U.S. Women's Amateur where she lost to semi-finalist Rachel Heck.

Kim won the TPS Sydney on the ALPG Tour in 2021 and again in 2022 after she turned professional late 2021. She rose to 288th in the Women's World Golf Rankings in March 2022. She gained conditional status for the 2022 Epson Tour at LPGA Q-School.

Amateur wins
2016 Greg Norman Junior Masters
2017 Victorian Junior Masters, Australian Girls' Amateur, South Australia Women's Amateur, Jack Newton International Junior Classic, Tasmanian Women's Amateur 
2018 Youth Olympic Games – individual, Federal Women's Amateur Open Championship, Dunes Medal, ANNIKA Invitational Australasia
2019 Victorian Women's Amateur Championship
2020 NSW Women's Amateur, The Avondale Amateur
2021 NSW Women's Amateur, Australian Women's Amateur

Source:

Professional wins (5)

ALPG Tour wins (2)

Epson Tour wins (1)
2022 IOA Golf Classic

Women's All-Pro Tour wins (2)
2021 Oscar Williams Classic, Texarkana Children's Charities Open (as an amateur)

Team appearances
Amateur
Toyota Junior Golf World Cup (representing Australia): 2017
Patsy Hankins Trophy (representing Asia/Pacific): 2018 (winners)
Espirito Santo Trophy (representing Australia): 2018
Queen Sirikit Cup (representing Australia): 2018

Source:

References

External links

Australian female golfers
ALPG Tour golfers
Golfers from Sydney
2000 births
Living people
Golfers at the 2018 Summer Youth Olympics
Youth Olympic gold medalists for Australia